A Business Intelligence Competency Center (BICC) is a cross-functional organizational team that has defined tasks, roles, responsibilities and processes for supporting and promoting the effective use of Business Intelligence (BI) across an organization.

Since 2001, the BICC concept has been further refined through practical implementations in organizations that have implemented BI and analytical software.

In practice, the term "BICC" is not well integrated into the nomenclature of business or public sector organizations and there are a large degree of variances in the organizational design for BICCs.  Nevertheless, the popularity of the BICC concept has caused the creation of units that focus on ensuring the use of the information for decision-making from BI software and increasing the return on investment  (ROI) of BI.

A BICC coordinates the activities and resources to ensure that a fact-based approach to decision making is systematically implemented throughout an organization.  It has responsibility for the governance structure for BI and analytical programs, projects, practices, software, and architecture. It is responsible for building the plans, priorities, infrastructure, and competencies that the organization needs to take forward-looking strategic decisions by using the BI and analytical software capabilities.

A BICC’s influence transcends that of a typical business unit, playing a crucial central role in the organizational change and strategic process.  Accordingly, the BICC’s purpose is to empower the entire organization to coordinate BI from all units.  Through centralization, it "…ensures that information and best practices are communicated and shared through the entire organization so that everyone can benefit from successes and lessons learned."

The BICC also plays an important organizational role facilitating interaction among the various cultures and units within the organization.  Knowledge transfer, enhancement of analytic skills, coaching and training are central to the mandate of the BICC.  A BICC should be pivotal in ensuring a high degree of information consumption and a ROI for BI.

Business Intelligence Competency Centers in U.S. Healthcare

Next to the U.S. government, the American healthcare industry generates the second largest amount of information every year. However, despite having complex information management needs, a KLAS report revealed that one-third of healthcare organizations do not have the appropriate business intelligence tools.

Since finance and energy industries have successfully implemented business intelligence competency centers (BICCs) and have produced financial returns on their investment and accelerated decision-making speed, the healthcare industry is initiating use of BICCs. Creating a business intelligence competency center in healthcare involves prioritizing information needs, creating data governance structures, identifying data stewards to provide data quality assurance, establishing ongoing education programs, and defining predictive modeling, analytics, data warehouse, and cloud storage tools.

Skills Needed

Information technology specialists in SQL design, relational databases, programming, reporting software, and analytics can provide the necessary technical information management skills. Data stewards, such as data analysts and scientists, understand the creation, capture, storage, and access processes needed to ensure high quality data.

Analytics Competency Center (ACC) 

In recent years  knowledge-oriented shared service centres with primary focus on offering analytics and data mining as an internal service across the organization have emerged. These centres are often referred to as Analytics Competency Center (ACC), Analytics Center of Excellence, Analytics Service Center, Big Data CoC or Big Data Lab. It is predicated, that by the end of 2017 already a quarter of all large firms will have such a dedicated unit for data and analytics. In contrast to classic BICC these centres do not place emphasis on reporting, historical analysis and dashboards. While BICC usually create enterprise-wide data marts and warehouses to establish a foundation for trusted information, an ACC follows a more strategic objective. ACCs follow the strategic objective to  transform the company towards a data driven company, build analytics expertise, formulate a data strategy, identify use cases for data mining, establish a manage a platform and drive the general adoption of analytics across the Organization. Usually, historically grown BICCs are transformed into an ACC, but also new formations of ACC can be found in practise.

References 

Business intelligence